Hamrapur is a railway station on the Panvel–Roha route of Central Railway in India. It is 98 km from Chhatrapati Shivaji Terminus via . Its station code is HMPR. It belongs to the Mumbai division of Central Railway.

The station is in Raigad district of Maharashtra.

References

Railway stations in Raigad district
Mumbai Suburban Railway stations
Panvel-Roha rail line